Pochinok is a village in Verkhoshizhemsky District of Kirov Oblast, Russia.

Rural localities in Kirov Oblast